Hani ibn Abd Latif ibn Talfah (born 1962) is an Iraqi security official during the rule of Saddam Hussein. He was born in 1962 in Tikrit. Tilfah was the last director of the SSO of Iraq from 2002 to 2003. He assisted Qusay Hussein and is a relative of Saddam Hussein.

Career
He was the King of Hearts in the deck of most-wanted Iraqi playing cards issued by the US government during the war in Iraq. Hani was captured on June 21, 2004.

On 6 June 2011, the Supreme Criminal Court of Iraq acquitted Hani in the case of the 1991 uprisings in Iraq because of insufficient evidence presented against him.

References

External links
HANI ABD-AL-LATIF TILFAH AL-TIKRITI | United Nations Security Council

1962 births
Living people
People from Tikrit
Arab Socialist Ba'ath Party – Iraq Region politicians
Iraqi politicians
Iraqi military personnel
Iraqi Sunni Muslims

Tulfah family
Most-wanted Iraqi playing cards
Iraq War prisoners of war
Iraqi prisoners of war